Jiuzhangli is a metro station on the Green Line operated by Taichung Metro in Wuri District, Taichung, Taiwan.

The station name is taken from an old name of the area.

Station layout

Exits 
Jiuzhangli station currently has one exit on the northern side of the station. The southern exit, which is closer to nearby communities, has not yet obtained private land, and is expected to open in 2023.

References 

Taichung Metro
Railway stations in Taichung
Railway stations opened in 2020